Luprisca incuba is an extinct species of ostracod crustacean. It was described as a new species in 2014, following discovery and analysis of fossilized specimens in mudstone rocks from New York, United States. A team of researchers from the universities of Yale and Kansas, Oxford and the Japan Agency of Marine Science and Technology made the discovery.

Etymology 
The genus and species name were named after Lucina, the goddess of childbirth in Roman mythology, and incuba, implying the mother was incubating her eggs.

Description 
The fossil was preserved in pyrite and was examined using X-Ray and CT Scan techniques.

Habitat and behavior 
This species was discovered in the mudstone rocks from New York State, from a rock layer called the Lorraine Group. The discovery was said to be the earliest evidence for parental care in the fossils of ostracod. Although some reported this discovery as "oldest parenting of fossil record", however some Cambrian fossil records with brood care, like Waptia are known.

“The mother kept the eggs and the hatchlings in brooding pouches within her body until the young ones were big enough to go out on their own,” David Siveter, professor of geology at the University of Leicester  in the UK who led the study, told The Telegraph India. A research paper by Siveter and his colleagues describing the ostracod fossils was published in the journal Current Biology.

References 

Ordovician arthropods
Prehistoric ostracods
Fossil taxa described in 2014
Fossils of the United States
Paleontology in New York (state)